Madridejos is a municipality located in the province of Toledo, Castile-La Mancha, Spain. According to the 2011 census (INE), the municipality has a population of 11304 inhabitants.

References

Municipalities in the Province of Toledo